The 1975–76 Úrvalsdeild karla was the 25th season of the Úrvalsdeild karla, the top tier men's basketball league on Iceland. The season started on 8 November 1975 and ended on 27 March 1976. Ármann won its first title by posting the best record in the league. It secured the title by beating KR, 84–74, in the last game of the season.

Competition format
The participating teams first played a conventional round-robin schedule with every team playing each opponent twice "home" and twice "away" for a total of 14 games. The top team won the national championship whilst the bottom team was relegated to Division I.

Regular season

References

External links
Official Icelandic Basketball Association website

Icelandic
Úrvalsdeild karla (basketball)